Nungali, or (with a different prefix) Yilngali, is an Australian language which is believed to be extinct. It was spoken in the Northern Territory of Australia, around the upper Daly River. Its closest relative is the Jaminjung language.

It is the only Yirram language which has retained the original four-class system in nominals. The four classes are masculine, feminine, neuter and plants, and each of the classes have separate prefixes expressing the absolutive case, locative or ergative case, and the dative case.

The locative case is also productive when it comes to placenames. An example is Nyimarlanpurruni referring to the Timber Creek area, which consists of the neuter locative prefix nyi-, the word for "river gum", the plural marker -purru, and an additional marker of the neuter locative, -ni.

References 

Yirram languages
Extinct languages of the Northern Territory
Languages extinct in the 2000s
Indigenous Australian languages in the Northern Territory